John Ellis Temple (August 8, 1927 – January 9, 1994) was a Major League Baseball second baseman who played for the Redlegs/Reds (1952–59; 1964); Cleveland Indians (1960–61), Baltimore Orioles (1962) and Houston Colt .45s (1962–63). Temple was born in Lexington, North Carolina. He batted and threw right-handed.

Temple was a career .284 hitter with 22 home runs and 395 RBI in 1420 games. A legitimate leadoff hitter and four-time All-Star, he was a very popular player in Cincinnati in the 1950s. Throughout his career, he walked more often than he struck out, compiling an outstanding 1.92 walk-to-strikeout ratio (648-to-338) and a .363 on-base percentage. Temple also had above-average speed and good instincts on the base paths. Quietly, he had 140 steals in 198 attempts (71%).

In , Temple and six of his Redleg teammates—Ed Bailey, Roy McMillan, Don Hoak, Gus Bell, Wally Post and Frank Robinson—were voted into the National League All-Star starting lineup, the result of a ballot stuffing campaign by Redlegs fans. Bell remained on the team as a reserve, but Post was taken off altogether. Bell and Post were replaced as starters by Hank Aaron and Willie Mays.

Temple enjoyed his best year in 1959, with career-highs in batting average (.311), home runs (8), RBI (67), runs (102), hits (186), at-bats (598), doubles (35) and triples (6). At the end of the season he was sent to Cleveland for Billy Martin, Gordy Coleman and Cal McLish.

Temple also played with Baltimore and Houston, and again with Cincinnati for his last major season, where he was a part-time coach. In August 1964, he cleaned out his locker after having a fight with fellow coach, Reggie Otero. When Fred Hutchinson had to leave the Reds due to his health, Cincinnati management decided to go with only two coaches and not reinstate Temple.

After his baseball career was over, Temple worked as a television newsman in Houston, Texas and got involved with a business that sold boats and RVs. The business failed causing Temple to lose everything, including his home. In 1977, Temple was arrested and charged with larceny of farm equipment. Through the efforts of his wife, who wrote a public letter to The Sporting News, Temple got legal assistance. He gave testimony to the South Carolina assembly against his criminal partners.

Temple died in Anderson, South Carolina in 1994 at the age of 66.

References

External links

1927 births
1994 deaths
American League All-Stars
Baltimore Orioles players
Baseball players from North Carolina
Cincinnati Reds coaches
Cincinnati Reds players
Cincinnati Redlegs players
Cleveland Indians players
Columbia Reds players
Deaths from cancer in South Carolina
Deaths from pancreatic cancer
Houston Colt .45s players
Lácteos de Pastora players
Major League Baseball broadcasters
Major League Baseball second basemen
National League All-Stars
Ogden Reds players
People from Lexington, North Carolina
Tulsa Oilers (baseball) players
Morganton Aggies players